Methyl propionate, also known as methyl propanoate, is an organic compound with the molecular formula CH3CH2CO2CH3.  It is a colorless liquid with a fruity, rum-like odor.

Preparation
Methyl propionate can be prepared by esterification of propionic acid with methanol. Industrially, it is prepared by carboalkoxylation, i.e., the reaction of ethylene with carbon monoxide and methanol in the presence of a catalyst:
C2H4  +  CO  +  MeOH   →   MeO2CCH2CH3

The reaction is catalyzed by nickel carbonyl and palladium(0) complexes.

Uses
Condensation of Methyl propionate with formaldehyde followed by dehydration yields methyl methacrylate:
MeO2CCH2CH3  +  CH2O   →   MeO2CCH(CH2OH)CH3
MeO2CCH(CH2OH)CH3  → MeO2CC(=CH2)CH3

Methyl propionate is used as a solvent for cellulose nitrate and lacquers, and as a raw material for the production of paints, varnishes and other chemicals such as methyl methacrylate. 

Due to its fruity smell and taste, it is also used in fragrances and flavoring.

References

Propionate esters
Methyl esters
Ester solvents
Sweet-smelling chemicals